High School for Recording Arts (HSRA) is a public charter high school located in the Midway neighborhood of Saint Paul, Minnesota, United States.  The school pioneered the concept of connecting with at-risk students through a hip-hop music program, hence the nickname "Hip-Hop High." There are no tuition fees.

History
The school opened in 1996 as a pilot program for at-risk students with interest in a music career. It is located in a  former factory and operates within and around two professional recording studios, providing students opportunities for individualized hands-on learning.

Academics
The school's academic structure combines daily mandatory courses in Language Arts and Mathematics with innovative, interdisciplinary courses and projects that connect traditional academics with dynamic, real-world learning. HSRA features both project-based learning and classroom learning. A personal learning plan is developed for each student.  HSRA graduates must meet all state requirements for graduation, create and present a portfolio comprising summaries of learning in twelve core areas, prepare a college acceptance letter, document their post-school plans, and submit samples of their work.

Demographics
 Gender:  59% male, 41% female
 Average age at enrollment:  17 years
 Income:  92% of students live at or below the poverty level.  92% of students qualify for free or reduced fee lunches.  30% of students are currently or have recently been homeless.
 Ethnicity:  86% Black, 6% Non-Hispanic White, 4% Hispanic, 4% Native American, 0.3% Asian.
 Geographic Reach:  29% from Minneapolis, 52% from St. Paul, 19% from other Minnesota Cities including Brooklyn Park, Brooklyn Center, and Maplewood.

Notable alumni
Christopher Dotson, better known by his stage name, Chrishan or Prince Chrishan is an American Grammy-nominated singer-songwriter and record producer

References

External links
 High School for the Recording Arts Minnesota
 Los Angeles Times video profile of 'Hip-Hop High'
 Star Tribune article on stay-in-school video "Dropping Out" created by Hip Hop High students

Charter schools in Minnesota
Educational institutions established in 1996
High schools in Saint Paul, Minnesota
Public high schools in Minnesota
1996 establishments in Minnesota